Duchowny (feminine: Duchowna) is a Polish-language surname literally meaning "clergyman”. 
Duchovny and Ducovny are both surnames. Notable people with the surname include:
Amram Ducovny (1927–2003), American non-fiction, play and novel writer
David Duchovny (born 1960), American actor
Daniel Duchovny (known as Danny Ducovny and also credited as Daniel Duchovny), a director of commercials
Roger Duchowny (born 1938), director

Places in Poland 
 Garlica Duchowna, village in Gmina Zielonki, within Kraków County, Lesser Poland Voivodeship
 Glinka Duchowna, village in Gmina Kostrzyn, within Poznań County, Greater Poland Voivodeship
 Górka Duchowna, village in Gmina Lipno, within Leszno County, Greater Poland Voivodeship
 Krusza Duchowna, village in Gmina Inowrocław, within Inowrocław County, Kuyavian-Pomeranian Voivodeship
 Przeginia Duchowna, village in Gmina Czernichów, within Kraków County, Lesser Poland Voivodeship
 Sadków Duchowny, village in Gmina Belsk Duży, within Grójec County, Masovian Voivodeship
 Wola Duchowna, village in Gmina Czermin, within Pleszew County, Greater Poland Voivodeship

Other 
 David Duchovny (song)

Polish-language surnames